Transcervical refers to a transluminal procedure through the cervix of the uterus, including:
Transcervical sterilization
Transcervical chorionic villus sampling